Ann T. Nelms (born 1929) is a prominent African American nuclear physicist. Her research, which involved the study of the persistence of nuclear radioactivity, was cited in reports on nuclear fallout and human health.

Life and career
Nelms was born in 1929 in Waycross, Georgia.

She worked as a nuclear physicist for National Bureau of Standards in the 1950s. She collaborated in her nuclear research with Ugo Fano, an Italian-born academician who joined the National Bureau of Standards as the bureau's first theoretical physicist after a stint at Aberdeen Proving Grounds. She also collaborated with J W Cooper, a senior research fellow with the National Bureau of Standards.

As of January 1954, she lived in the Washington, D.C., area with her husband and one-year-old child.

Publications
 "Graphs of the Compton Energy-Angle Relationship and the Klein-Nishina formula from 10 Kev to 500 Mev", published in 1953, 89 pp, US Government Printing Office.
 "Energy Loss and Range of Electrons and Positrons", published in the Circular of the National Bureau of Standards, Issue 577, 1956, 30 pp, US Government Printing Office.
 "An Approximate Expression of Gamma Ray Degradation Spectra", co-authored with U Fano, published in the Journal of Research, National Bureau of Standards, Vol 59, July–December 1957, pg 122.
 "U235 Fission Product Decay Spectra at Various Times After Fission", co-authored with J W Cooper, published in Health Physics, volume 1, pg 427, 1959. It is cited extensively in "Fallout Phenomena Symposium, April 12-14, 1966, published in the proceedings of the US Naval Radiological Laboratory, USNRDL-R&L-177, June 9, 1966. It also is referenced in A Compendium of Information for Use in Controlling Radiation Emergencies, Including Lecture Notes from a Training Session at Idaho Falls, Idaho February 12-14, 1958, published September 1, 1960, by the Office of Health and Safety, Atomic Energy Commission, under sponsorship of the US Department of Energy.
"Data on the Atomic form Factor: computation and Survey," co-authored with Irwin Oppenheim, published in Journal of Research of the National Bureau of Standards, Vol. 55, No. 1, July 1955, research Paper 2604.

References

1929 births
21st-century American physicists
American nuclear physicists
Living people
Academics from Georgia (U.S. state)
Women nuclear physicists
21st-century African-American scientists
20th-century African-American people